All the Best: My Life in Letters and Other Writings is a 1999 compilation of his writings by former U.S. President George H. W. Bush. The book is a collection of letters, diary entries, and memos, in the structure of an autobiography. The letters begin during Bush's service as a pilot in the United States Navy during World War II, and end shortly after Bush's son Jeb's election as Governor of Florida in 1998.

See also
List of autobiographies by presidents of the United States

References

External links
Presentation by Bush on All the Best, October 6, 1999, C-SPAN

1999 non-fiction books
Books about George H. W. Bush
Books by George H. W. Bush
Political memoirs
American memoirs
Collections of letters
Books written by presidents of the United States